In mathematics, in particular linear algebra, the Sherman–Morrison formula, named after Jack Sherman and Winifred J. Morrison, computes the inverse of the sum of an invertible matrix  and the outer product, of vectors  and . The Sherman–Morrison formula is a special case of the Woodbury formula.  Though named after Sherman and Morrison, it appeared already in earlier publications.

Statement 
Then  is invertible iff  . In this case, 

The general form shown here is the one published by Bartlett.

Proof 
() To prove that the backward direction  is invertible with inverse given as above) is true, we verify the properties of the inverse. A matrix  (in this case the right-hand side of the Sherman–Morrison formula) is the inverse of a matrix  (in this case ) if and only if .

We first verify that the right hand side satisfies .

To end the proof of this direction, we need to show that  in a similar way as above:

() Reciprocally, if , then via the matrix determinant lemma, so  is not invertible.

Application

The computation is relatively cheap because the inverse of  does not have to be computed from scratch (which in general is expensive), but can be computed by correcting (or perturbing) .

If  is a unit column, the computation takes only  scalar multiplications. The same goes if  is a unit column.

This formula also has application in theoretical physics. Namely, in quantum field theory, one uses this formula to calculate the propagator of a spin-1 field. The inverse propagator (as it appears in the Lagrangian) has the form . One uses the Sherman–Morrison formula to calculate the inverse (satisfying certain time-ordering boundary conditions) of the inverse propagator—or simply the (Feynman) propagator—which is needed to perform any perturbative calculation involving the spin-1 field.

Alternative verification

Following is an alternate verification of the Sherman–Morrison formula using the easily verifiable identity

 .

Let 

 

then

 .

Substituting  gives

Generalization (Woodbury matrix identity) 

Given a square invertible  matrix , an  matrix , and a  matrix , let  be an  matrix such that . Then, assuming  is invertible, we have

See also 
 The matrix determinant lemma performs a rank-1 update to a determinant.
 Woodbury matrix identity
 Quasi-Newton method
 Binomial inverse theorem
 Bunch–Nielsen–Sorensen formula
 Maxwell stress tensor contains an application of the Sherman–Morrison formula.

References

External links 
 

Linear algebra
Matrix theory